Anjali Goswami is a Resesarch Leader and Dean of the Graduate Centre at the Natural History Museum.  She is an Honorary Professor of Paleobiology at University College London (UCL) in the Department of Genetics, Evolution, and Environment. She was elected President of the Linnean Society of London, in 2022 and is the first person of colour elected to this role since its founding in 1788. Goswami's expertise is in vertebrate evolution and development, particularly using high-resolution 3D images of specimens to quantify and reconstruct the evolution of biodiversity and understand how development, ecology and large-scale environmental effects have shaped animal evolution through deep time.

Education and early career 
Goswami spent her undergraduate years (1998) at the University of Michigan, where she focused on how early whales transitioned from the land to the water. After this, she spent time in India at the Bandhavgarh National Park conducting field work in tiger conservation and ecotourism. 

In 2005 Goswami earned her doctorate at the University of Chicago and Field Museum of Natural History from the Committee on Evolutionary Biology. Her thesis, titled The Evolution of Morphological Integration In the Mammalian Skull, studied the morphological integration, phenotypic modularity, and developmental trait correlations in 107 species of mammals. These 107 species (98 are extant and 9 are fossil based) include representatives of the monotremes, placentals, and marsupials. During her PhD work, she also conducted field work in Madagascar, India, Chile, Peru, and Western U.S.

Career 

After completing her PhD, Goswami began a National Science Foundation international postdoctoral fellowship at the Natural History Museum, London, and then undertook a lectureship position in the Earth Sciences department at the University of Cambridge from 2007 to 2009, where she was a fellow of  King's College Cambridge.  In 2009 Goswami became a lecturer of Palaeobiology at University College London (UCL) in the Department of Genetics, Evolution, and Environment and the Department of Earth Sciences. She was promoted to Reader in 2013 and Professor of Palaeobiology in 2016. At UCL Goswami was also affiliated with the Department of Cell and Developmental Biology. In 2017, she became principal investigator and research leader at the Natural History Museum in the Life Sciences. and Honorary Professor of Palaeobiology at University College London.

Outside of her roles at Natural History Museum, Goswami is a member of several other committees, projects, and societies. Goswami served as Chair of the Program Committee, 'member at large' on the Executive Committee, and as Chair of the Development Committee for the Society of Vertebrate Paleontology. Goswami was co-director of the London Centre for Ecology and Evolution from 2014 to 2022 and is currently on the Executive Committee for the International Society for Vertebrate Morphology and on the Board of Visitors for the Oxford University Museum of Natural History. She has served on the editorial boards for PLOS One, Journal of Vertebrate Paleontology, Biology Letters, Evolution Letters, Integrative and Comparative Biology, and Paleobiology and is currently on the editoral board of Annual Review of Ecology, Evolution, and Systematics.  

Goswami's expertise is in vertebrate evolution and development, particularly using high-resolution 3D images of specimens to quantify and reconstruct the evolution of biodiversity and understand how development, ecology and large-scale environmental effects have shaped animal evolution through deep time . She has searched for fossils all over the world, from Svalbard to Madagascar, and currently leads expeditions in Argentina and India with the aim to improve understanding of the huge change in global biodiversity as a result of the Cretaceous/Paleogene mass extinction 66 million years ago, which ended the dominance of non-avian dinosaurs. Anjali also created and manages www.phenome10k.org, a free online database for 3D biological images for research and education. Her work has been supported by the European Research Council, Leverhulme Trust, National Science Foundation, Natural Environment Research Council, Royal Society, and National Geographic.

She has published more than 130 scientific articles on the evolution of different groups from insects to dinosaurs, but her main interest is in the evolution of mammals.  Goswami has authored and edited Carnivoran Evolution, a volume which explores the latest scientific understanding of carnivoran relationships, ecomorphology and macroevolutionary patterns.

Awards 
 Bicentenary medal (2016).
 Zoological Society of London Scientific Medal (2017)
 Hind Rattan (2020)
 President's Medal of the Paleontological Association (2021)
Society of Vertebrate Paleontology Robert Lynn Carroll award (2021)

References 

University of Michigan alumni
University of Chicago alumni
Living people
Paleobiologists
Year of birth missing (living people)
American women biologists
American women scientists
American people of Indian descent
21st-century American women